Franco Dragone (12 December 1952 – 30 September 2022) was an Italian-born Belgian theatre director. He was the founder and artistic director of Dragone, a creative company specializing in the creation of large-scale theatre shows. He was also known for his work with Cirque du Soleil and Celine Dion.

CNN said that Dragone was "one of the key architects of Cirque du Soleil's theatrical style", and that "while Cirque du Soleil's signature was contemporary circus, Dragone's solo work embodies more theater, dance -- and, of course, water" through the use of his "trademark" aquatic stages.

Dragone died from a severe chest infection in Cairo, Egypt, on 30 September 2022 at the age of 69.

Early life
Dragone was born in 1952 in Cairano, a small town in southern Italy. At the age of seven, he moved to the mining region of La Louvière in Belgium with his family so his parents could work in Belgium's coal mines. He remembers that being an "artist" was not treated seriously by the mining community in La Louvière. His father, however, was broad-minded and enrolled Dragone in a liberal lycée. As a student, Dragone was taught a wide range of topics and was allowed to choose his field of interest. Dragone chose the arts.

In the 1970s he studied theatre at the Belgian Royal Conservatory of Mons. Starting his career as an actor in subsidized Belgian art theater, he switched to activist theater, or "theater without actors" according to Dragone. His earliest theatrical work was explicitly political, working as a director of theatre and film in the mode of the commedia dell'arte dramatist Dario Fo.  The theatre works he helped create expressed social situations, interpreting true stories of the homeless, drug addicts, and prison inmates, and casting non-actors who shared their stories to perform in the shows. In this context Dragone began to teach staging, or visual expression, and came to believe that it was "possible to do high quality shows for mainstream people".

Cirque du Soleil
In the 1980s, Dragone came to Montreal, Quebec, Canada, in pursuit of "a beautiful girl". In Montreal, Guy Caron, director of the National Circus School, invited him to conduct workshops with the students and teachers at his school. Dragone then created, directed and produced a show for the end of the school year. Guy Laliberté saw one of these performances in 1984, the same year he formed Cirque du Soleil. In 1985, Laliberté sought out Guy Caron to join Cirque du Soleil. Caron, in turn, asked Dragone to join as a creator.

From the years 1985 to 1998, Dragone would direct nearly all of Cirque du Soleil's most prestigious shows and played a significant role in developing Cirque du Soleil's distinctive merging of theater and circus performance. In the early 1990s, Dragone's reputation grew with the production of Nouvelle Expérience and Saltimbanco, nontraditional circus productions in which postmodern dance, music, and circus acrobatics were interlaced with a dreamlike narrative.

His visibility greatly increased after he directed and introduced the cutting-edge Cirque du Soleil production Mystère at the Treasure Island hotel in Las Vegas, Nevada. Mystère helped to change the nature of production shows in Las Vegas.  While Dragone would direct only one other show with the company in Las Vegas, O in 1998, to many he was the face of Cirque du Soleil in Las Vegas.  The shows Dragone created with Cirque du Soleil had single-handedly brought the contemporary circus movement into the mainstream of American entertainment.  Around the world, close to 100 million people have now seen Dragone's creations. Dragone directed Cirque du Soleil's first motion picture, Alegría, in 1999. In 1999 Dragone directed the music video for Lara Fabian's song "Adagio".

Dragone Group
In 2000 he amicably split from Cirque du Soleil and formed his own company called the Franco Dragone Entertainment Group (later shortened to "Dragone"), based in his hometown of La Louvière in Belgium. In 2003 Dragone created A New Day... starring Céline Dion at Caesars Palace in Las Vegas. When A New Day ended its run in 2007, Billboard reported it was the highest-grossing residency of all time.

In 2005, Dragone debuted his fourth production on the Las Vegas Strip with the opening of Le Rêve at the Wynn Las Vegas. For this show he used performers mainly from disciplines related to gymnastics. Like his 1998 show O for Cirque du Soleil, Le Rêve made extensive use of a custom-designed water stage. CNN called it a "bombastic, splashy celebration of life" with "diving feats and stunning special effects".

In 2007, he directed a new musical based on Prosper Mérimée's novella Carmen, which premiered at the La Jolla Playhouse. He also worked on an adaption of the Divine Comedy with composer Ennio Morricone.

Franco Dragone was in charge of the opening ceremony show for the 2010 South American Games that took place in Medellín, Colombia on 19 March 2010. The main themes of the show were inspired by Medellin's culture, business and geography.

Dragone in Macau and Dubai
In 2010, building on his previous experience using aquatic stages in O and Le Rêve, Dragone directed a Macau-based show entitled The House of Dancing Water in the City of Dreams. The House of Dancing Water is the largest aquatic production in the world, and was developed by Dragone in Belgium over 19 months, with the permanent theater taking five years to build. It features around 70 artists, some from Dragone's previous creations with Cirque du Soleil, performing dance, swimming and acrobatics. The House of Dancing Water is set in the 2000-seat Dancing Water Theater designed by Pei Partnership Architects. The 270-degree theater-in-the-round has a central stage with a diameter of approximately 25 meters (82 feet), surrounded by sloped seating on three sides. The theater arena has a 40-meter-high steel trussed space (30 meters clear) providing generous height to the show's display of acrobatics. The show, which incorporates various design elements such as fire, water effects, and atmospheric effects, premiered on 17 September 2010.

In 2012, Dragone's new cabaret Taboo: The Show Naughty and Naughtier premiered at City of Dreams.

On 29 March 2012, Dragone was awarded a doctor honoris causa degree for general merits by the University of Antwerp, in recognition of his innovative and cosmopolitan approach to theatre.

In 2012 Dragone's business group came under investigation by Belgian authorities for "serious and organized international tax offenses" and money laundering. The group's offices in Louvain, as well as the private homes of Franco Dragone, the group's CEO, its CFO and a former employee, were raided in October 2012 as part of the investigation. The Belgian investigating office suspected Dragone of fraudulently using a global network of shell companies to conceal assets in offshore tax havens to avoid paying taxes. In a press conference addressing the investigation in January 2013, Dragone claimed that the purpose of setting up this international structure had not been to commit fraud, but to avoid double or triple taxation by different countries. He added that he was ready to change his business' structure to provide more transparency. His company Lina International, reportedly used to finance The House of Dancing Water, was named in the Panama Papers in 2015.

In early 2013, Dragone produced, created and directed Story of a Fort, Legacy of a Nation, a show that ran from 28 February through 9 March 2013 as the centrepiece event of the Qasr al-Hosn festival in Abu Dhabi. The show celebrated Emirati history with technology, acrobatics, and traditional Emirati dance and music.

In 2014, Dragone opened The Han Show in Wuhan, China, celebrating the essence of the Han culture. The Han Show Theater, designed by Mark Fisher and inspired by the traditional red Chinese lantern, is 60 meters high, 100 meters in diameter and houses more than 2000 seats. In spring 2015, Dragone created a new show in Paris for the cabaret Le Lido, titled Paris Merveilles. In March 2016 he confirmed he was working on a new project for Las Vegas.  In 2016, Dragone directed a new show featuring Russian pop icon Philipp Kirkorov  called  ('I'), which premiered in the Kremlin Palace on 16 March.

In 2017, Dragone's show La Perle opened in Al Habtoor City, Dubai, in a custom-made 10-story theater. The show involved waterfalls, fires, motorcyclists spinning inside a suspended metal sphere, acrobatics into water, and other features. Preparing La Perle took Dragone four to five years, and during its first year he "continually tweaked and improved" the show.

By September 2017, around 100 million people had seen Dragone's work.

Style

According to CNN, Dragone was "one of the key architects of Cirque du Soleil's unique theatrical style." CNN also says that "while Cirque du Soleil's signature was contemporary circus, Dragone's solo work embodies more theater, dance -- and, of course, water" through the use of his "trademark" aquatic stages.

Dragone seeks to invoke a common language of "emotional archetypes" in his theatrical productions. According to Dragone, the influence of various painters and the theorist Antonin Artaud have pushed him toward a "concrete language intended for the senses", with the use of poetic visuals replacing the poetry of language. Dragone has objected to comparisons of his work to Salvador Dalí or Federico Fellini, noting that he travels frequently and has been influenced by a great many painters. In his search to "make the invisible visible" with his theater, he has cited the director Peter Brook as an influence. According to Dragone, "With time and experience I evolve. I see things differently, so I want my next show to be impacted by these changes. I want every project to be a unique experience for the spectators, and every next project to be a new stage of my own development as an artist."

His shows tend to have a very large scale. For example La Perle, showcased in a new theater of the same name, was his first permanent show in the Middle East, with stunts such as "performers flying across the stage at 15 kilometers an hour before diving from heights of 25 meters into the 860-square-meter pool and seemingly disappearing, only to return from land seconds later." It was themed to "capture of essence of Dubai" and its negotiations of opposing elements, such as water and desert, and tradition and modernity. It also features traditional pearl diving themes. The show took $400 million to create, with 450 performances held a year. According to CNN, the stage was "an engineering feat, holding a colossal 2.7 million liters of recycled water -- enough to fill an Olympic pool -- which can be drained in less than a minute for land-based exploits." Regarding the unusually large scale of his productions, Dragone has remarked that "Greek tragedies were done in huge spaces, too."

Shows

Cirque du Soleil
1985: La Magie Continue
1987: Le Cirque Réinventé
1990: Nouvelle Expérience
1992: Saltimbanco
1993: Mystère
1994: Alegría
1996: Quidam
1998: O
1998: La Nouba
1999: Alegría (co-writer, director, producer)

Dragone
1999
 Music video for Lara Fabian's song "Adagio" 
2000:
Décrocher la lune, La Louvière, directed by Luc Petit
Opening ceremony of Euro 2000
2001:
Chapeau Europa: Ceremony for the European Union Belgian Presidency in Brussels
2002:
Disney Cinema Parade, for Disneyland Paris
Décrocher la lune 2, La Louvière, directed by Luc Petit
Au fil de l’homme
2003:
A New Day..., for Céline Dion
2005:
Le Rêve, at the Wynn Las Vegas
Ma tête est ailleurs, for Saule et les Pleureurs, Mons, Belgium
Zarabanda
2006:
Décrocher la lune 3, La Louvière, directed by Luc Petit
2007:
Carmen, the Musical, San Diego
Othello, passeur, Mons, Belgium
Fortissim’O, Vienna
2008:
Le Potager des visionnaires, Quebec, for the 400th birthday of Quebec City
2009:
KDO, Brussels
Décrocher la lune 4, La Louvière, directed by Luc Petit
2010:
2010 South American Games opening show in Medellín, Colombia
The House of Dancing Water at City of Dreams, Macau
2013:
Story of a Fort, Legacy of a Nation, Abu Dhabi
2014
The Han Show in Wuhan, China
2015
Paris Merveilles at Le Lido in Paris, France
The Dai Show in Xishuangbanna, China
2017
La Perle at Al Habtoor City, Dubai
Я (Ya) for Philipp Kirkorov

Other
1985: La vente aux enchères, Cirque du Trottoir
1986: Eldorado, Compagnie des Mutants
1987: Les Communs des Mortels, a Compagnie du Campus and Collectif 1984 coproduction
1987: Flic, Flac, Compagnie des Funambules (Belgium)
1987: La tête dans le si bémol, with Michel Dallaire and Pierre Lafontaine
1992: La ballade de l'homme gris, Compagnie du Campus
1993: Pomp, Duck, Circumstance, Düsseldorf
1996: Poussière du temps, Compagnie du Campus
2015: Paris Merveilles, cabaret Lido de Paris
2016: Cagnasse tutto, Foja at Teatro di San Carlo, Naples

Bibliography
  Yves Vasseur, Franco Dragone: une part de rêve, ed. Luc Pire, 2006
  Yves Vasseur, Franco Dragone, une improbable odyssée, ed. Labor, 2002
  Franco Dragone, Claude Renard, Le Tailleur du Rêve, ed. Les Impressions Nouvelles, 2006

Documentaries
  Jacob Berger, Le Rêve, 2005: documentary series for Arte about Franco Dragone's work on the show Le Rêve
  , Looking For Dragone, 2009

References

External links
Official site of Dragone

1952 births
2022 deaths
Cirque du Soleil
Belgian film directors
Belgian theatre directors
Circuses
Belgian people of Italian descent
People from the Province of Avellino
People named in the Panama Papers